Vegard Sannes (born 4 September 1976) is a retired Norwegian football midfielder who notably played for FK Bodø/Glimt.

He was born in Kirkenes, and started his career in Kirkenes IF. He then continued in Alta IF, before joining Bodø/Glimt ahead of the 2001 season. He played 87 games and scored 4 goals in the Norwegian Premier League over the following years, and stayed in Bodø/Glimt after their relegation 2005. The team was re-promoted ahead of the 2008 season.

However, he did not play a single game in the 2008 season due to a knee injury, and at the end of the season his contract with Bodø/Glimt was not renewed. He was interested in a return to Alta IF, but not with the current knee injury, and therefore he retired.

Career statistics

References

1976 births
Living people
People from Sør-Varanger
Norwegian footballers
Alta IF players
FK Bodø/Glimt players
Eliteserien players
Association football midfielders
Sportspeople from Troms og Finnmark